Libertarian Review was an American libertarian magazine published until 1981.  It had been established by Robert Kephart in 1972 as a book-review magazine, initially titled SIL Book Review (2 issues), then Books for Libertarians, and was renamed with the March, 1974 issue.  In 1977, Charles Koch purchased the magazine and turned it into a national magazine under the editorship of Roy A. Childs, Jr.

At the time, there were two other slick-paper libertarian magazines, Reason, which at the time leaned towards the right wing of the libertarian spectrum, and Inquiry, which tilted left. Libertarian Review was more movement-oriented than either magazine. It also differed from both in its strong opposition to nuclear energy.

In the summer of 1981, the Koch Foundation, which was funding Inquiry as well as Libertarian Review, decided that it could not continue to support two magazines and folded Libertarian Review into Inquiry starting with the January 1982 issue.  The last issue was November/December 1981.  However, Cato then transferred Inquiry to the Libertarian Review Foundation with the February 1982 issue.

References

External links
Libertarian Review at Libertarianism.org

1972 establishments in the United States
1981 disestablishments in the United States
Cato Institute
Defunct political magazines published in the United States
Libertarian magazines published in the United States
Libertarianism in the United States
Magazines disestablished in 1981
Magazines established in 1972
Magazines published in New York City
Magazines published in San Francisco
Magazines published in Virginia
Magazines published in Washington, D.C.
Monthly magazines published in the United States